The Fifth Republic of Venezuela, commonly known as the Bolivarian Republic of Venezuela, is the period in contemporary Venezuelan history from 1999 with the election of Hugo Chávez to the presidency and the installation of his Bolivarian Revolution, to the present day.

Venezuela has been considered the Bolivarian Republic following the adoption of the new Constitution of 1999, when the state was renamed in honor of Simón Bolívar. Since Chávez's election into office, Venezuela developed into a dominant-party system, dominated by the United Socialist Party of Venezuela and where numerous other parties exist. The 2017 Venezuelan Constituent Assembly election raised concerns of an emerging dictatorship.

Under the Bolivarian government, Venezuela went from being one of the richest countries in Latin America to one of the poorest. Hugo Chávez's socioeconomic policies of relying on oil sales and importing goods resulted in large amounts of debt, no change to corruption in Venezuela and culminated into the crisis in Bolivarian Venezuela. As a result of the crisis, the Bolivarian diaspora, the largest emigration of people in Latin America's history, occurred, with over 4 million Venezuelans – about 10% of the country's population – emigrating.

References 

History of Venezuela